The Biscuit (Swedish: Skorpan) is a 1956 Swedish comedy film directed by Hans Lagerkvist and starring Nils Poppe, Marianne Bengtsson and Holger Löwenadler. It was shot at the Råsunda Studios in Stockholm. The film's sets were designed by the art director P.A. Lundgren.

Cast
 Nils Poppe as 	Valfrid, pickpocket
 Marianne Bengtsson as 	Doris
 Holger Löwenadler as 	Hugo Braxenhielm
 Gunnar Björnstrand as 	Freddie Braxenhjelm
 Siv Ericks as 	Mrs. Cecilia Braxenhielm
 Jan Molander as Sixten Braxenhielm
 Elisabet Falk as 	Ulrika Widell
 Åke Fridell as 	Filip Schöling
 Anna-Lisa Baude as 	Mrs. Schöling
 Georg Rydeberg as Lawyer
 Fritiof Billquist as 	Policeman
 Arthur Fischer as Johansson, first mate
 Ragnar Arvedson as 	Hair dresser
 Pia Arnell as 	Amanda, waitress
 Astrid Bodin as 	Washing-woman 
 Rolf Botvid as 	Policeman
 Birger Åsander as Jojje
 Sven Holmberg as Policeman 
 Mille Schmidt as Policeman 
 Svea Holst as 	Braxenhielm's maid 
 Ulf Johansson as 	Jacquetten 
 Ludde Juberg as 	Karlsson 
 Arne Lindblad as 	Man with the watch 
 Olav Riégo as 	Slussberg

References

Bibliography 
 Qvist, Per Olov & von Bagh, Peter. Guide to the Cinema of Sweden and Finland. Greenwood Publishing Group, 2000.

External links 
 

1956 films
Swedish comedy films
1955 comedy films
1950s Swedish-language films
Films directed by Hans Lagerkvist
Swedish black-and-white films
1950s Swedish films